Moussa Ould Ebnou (born 1956) is one of Mauritania’s greatest novelists. He has published two novels in French: L’amour impossible (1990) and Le Barzakh (1994), which were later published in Arabic as: الحب المستحيل ("al-Hubb al-Mustahil") (1999), and مدينة الرياح (Madinat al-Riyah) (1996). Ebnou has also published two other works in Arabic: حج الفجار (Hujj al-Fijar) (2003), and الامثال والحكم الشعبية الموريتانية al-Imthal w'al-Hakm ash-Sha'biya al-Muritaniya .

Moussa Ould Ebnou was born in Boutilimit.

Notes and External Links

UNESCO.org 

1956 births
Living people
Mauritanian male writers
Mauritanian novelists
Male novelists
20th-century novelists
People from Boutilimit
20th-century male writers